Alastor bulgaricus is a species of wasp in the family Vespidae.

References

bulgaricus